Thandwe Airport  is an airport serving Thandwe, a town in the Rakhine State of Myanmar. The IATA code is based on the town's name during British colonial rule, Sandoway.

Airlines and destinations

Accidents and incidents
On 16 August 1972, a Douglas C-47B, registration XY-ACM of Burma Airways crashed shortly after take-off on a scheduled passenger flight. Twenty-eight people on board were killed and only 3 survived.
On 17 February 2012, Air KBZ ATR-72-500, XY-AIT overran the runway at Thandwe Airport but no injuries reported.

References

External links 
 

Airports in Myanmar